Coladenia similis is a species of spread-winged skipper butterflies endemic to the Philippines.

References

Pyrginae
Butterflies described in 1992